Gobiopsis namnas is a species of goby found in the Northwest Pacific Ocean in Japan.

Size

Etymology
The fish is named with the abbreviation of National Museum of Nature and Science  in Tokyo, Japan, which conducted the deep-water biological survey that collected the type specimens.

References

Gobiidae
Taxa named by Koichi Shibukawa
Fish described in 2010